Gianni Leoni (1 March 1915 - 15 August 1951) was an Italian Grand Prix motorcycle road racer from Como. His best years were in 1950 when he finished second to Bruno Ruffo in the 125cc world championship and in the 1951 season, when he again finished in second place, this time to Carlo Ubbiali. Leoni was the winner of the first Nations Grand Prix in the inaugural 1949 Grand Prix motorcycle racing season. He was killed while competing in the 1951 Ulster Grand Prix.

References 

1915 births
1951 deaths
Sportspeople from Como
Italian motorcycle racers
125cc World Championship riders
250cc World Championship riders
Isle of Man TT riders
Motorcycle racers who died while racing
Sport deaths in Northern Ireland